Ray Di Carlo is an American producer, executive producer, director, and co-founder (along with Chel White and David Daniels) of the Portland, Oregon based animation studio Bent Image Lab.

History
Since 2002, Di Carlo has acted as Executive Producer at Bent Image Lab. The studio's advertising agency clients including DDB Worldwide(Chicago, NY, LA, and Tribal British Columbia), FCB, Leo Burnett Worldwide, Santo (Bueno Aires/London), Goodby, Silverstein & Partners, Sedgwick Rd., Campbell Ewald, Pedone, Euro RSCG, The Buntin Group, Borders Perrin and Norrander, and Ogilvy & Mather, as well as networks clients NBC, TBS, Cartoon Network, The Learning Channel, and PBS.

Di Carlo got his start in special effects, working as leadman on The Abyss, directed by James Cameron. In 1995 Di Carlo directed Telepresence, a science fiction feature film produced in Portland, Oregon.

In 2008, Di Carlo and Bent cofounder David Daniels co-directed "Hidden Formula," a Coca-Cola television commercial. In 2006, Di Carlo and Bent co-founder Chel White co-directed "Provocateur," a Lux soap ad. Both television commercials were created for the advertising agency Santo, in Buenos Aires, Argentina.

References

American film directors
American animators
American animated film directors
American animated film producers
Living people
Year of birth missing (living people)